Urocoras is a genus of funnel weavers first described by S. V. Ovtchinnikov in 1999.

Species
 it contains four species:

Urocoras longispina (Kulczyński, 1897) – Central, Eastern Europe
Urocoras matesianus (de Blauwe, 1973) – Italy
Urocoras munieri (Simon, 1880) – Italy, Slovenia, Croatia
Urocoras nicomedis (Brignoli, 1978) – Turkey

References

External links

Agelenidae
Araneomorphae genera